Poly(U)-binding-splicing factor PUF60 is a protein that in humans is encoded by the PUF60 gene.

The protein encoded by this gene is a Ro RNP-binding protein. It interacts with Ro RNPs and their interaction is thought to represent a gain of function for Ro RNPs. This protein also forms a ternary complex with far upstream element (FUSE) and FUSE-binding protein. It can repress a c-myc reporter via the FUSE. It is also known to target transcription factor IIH and inhibit activated transcription. This gene is implicated in the xeroderma pigmentosum disorder. There are two alternatively spliced transcript variants of this gene encoding different isoforms. There seems to be evidence of multiple polyadenylation sites for this gene.

Interactions 

PUF60 has been shown to interact with U2AF2.

References

Further reading

External links 
 PDBe-KB provides an overview of all the structure information available in the PDB for Human Poly(U)-binding-splicing factor PUF60